Jealous as a Tiger (French: Jaloux comme un tigre) is a 1964 French comedy film directed by Darry Cowl and Maurice Delbez and starring Darry Cowl, Francis Blanche and Jean Poiret.

Cast
 Darry Cowl as Henri
 Francis Blanche a Le chauffeur
 Jean Poiret as Le docteur Raymond
 Michel Serrault as M. Lurot
 Jean Richard as Le monsieur à la voiture accidentée
 Dany Saval as Jeanine
 Rolande Kalis as Sophie 
 Jean Yanne as Alphonse
 Denise Provence as Mme Lurot
 Michael Lonsdale as L'automobiliste qui grimace 
 France Rumilly as La secrétaire
 Françoise Dorin as	Mme Raymond
 René-Jean Chauffard as le bijoutier qui cherche des escargots
 Jeannette Batti as Dame Toilette

References

Bibliography 
 Martin, Yves. Le cinéma français, 1946-1966: un jeune homme au fil des vagues. Editions Méréal, 1998.

External links 
 

1964 films
1964 comedy films
French comedy films
1960s French-language films
Films directed by Maurice Delbez
1960s French films